Rorschach is an American comic book limited series written by Tom King and drawn by Jorge Fornés. The series is published by DC Comics under their DC Black Label imprint. The series is a sequel to both the comic book maxiseries Watchmen by Alan Moore and Dave Gibbons, and the television limited series of the same name by Damon Lindelof, which also served as a sequel to the same comic book series.

Premise 
Thirty-five years after the death of Rorschach, and one year after the death of Doctor Manhattan, an unnamed homicide detective investigates the crimes committed by Wil Myerson, a comic book creator that assumed the Rorschach mantle.

Characters

 The Detective
William "Wil" Myerson / Rorschach
 Laura Cummings / The Kid

Reception

References

DC Comics titles

Watchmen
Comics by Tom King (writer)